José María Sánchez Leiva (born July 12, 1985) is a Chilean former football midfielder who played as a midfielder.

Club career
From 2009 to 2011 he played for Iranian club Shirin Faraz.

In 2012, he played for Deportes Linares in the Chilean Tercera A.

Career statistics

References

External links
 
 José María Sánchez at PlaymakerStats

1985 births
Living people
People from Santiago Province, Chile
Chilean footballers
Chilean expatriate footballers
Club Deportivo Palestino footballers
San Marcos de Arica footballers
Deportes Santa Cruz footballers
Shirin Faraz Kermanshah players
Deportes Linares footballers
Azadegan League players
Tercera División de Chile players
Chilean expatriate sportspeople in Iran
Expatriate footballers in Iran
Association football midfielders
21st-century Chilean people